Dowager Imperial Noble Consort Quehui (1668 – 24 April 1743), of the Manchu Bordered Yellow Banner Tunggiya clan, was a consort of the Kangxi Emperor. She was 14 years his junior.

Life

Family background
Imperial Noble Consort Quehui's personal name was not recorded in history. Her family originally belonged to the Han Chinese Plain Blue Banner.

 Father: Guowei (d. 1719), served as a first rank military official, and held the title of a first class duke
 Paternal grandfather: Tulai (1606–1658), served as a first rank military official, and held the title of a first class duke
 Paternal grandmother: Lady Gioro
 Paternal aunt: Empress Xiaokangzhang (1638–1663), the mother of the Kangxi Emperor (1654–1722)
 Mother: Lady Hešeri
 Six brothers
 First brother: Yekeshu (叶克书), father of Shun'anyan
 Second brother: Dekesi (德克新), served as third class imperial guard
 Third brother: Longkodo (d. 1728)
 Fourth brother: Hongshan (洪善)
 Fifth brother: Qingyuan (庆元)
 Sixth brother: Qingfu (庆復; d. 1747), served as first rank military official (都統/都统, pinyin: dutong) from 1727-1733, Viceroy of Liangjiang, Viceroy of Yunnan, Viceroy of Liangguang in 1741, a Grand Secretary of Wenhua hall (文华殿大学士)
 Elder sister: Empress Xiaoyiren (d. 1689)

Kangxi era 
The future Imperial Noble Consort Quehui was born in 1668. It is not known when lady Tunggiya entered the Forbidden City; historical records state that she was present in 1697 as a consort. By that year, Empress Xiaoyiren, Noble Consort Wenxi and Imperial Noble Consort Jingmin had died, leaving imperial harem without de iure head. Kangxi Emperor didn't instate a new empress, instead granted lady Tunggiya the title "Noble Consort" (贵妃) in January 1701. As she was an only noble consort, she didn't receive any honorifical name. In 1706, she received 150 lard fishes, while Empress Dowager Renxian received 50 sesame oil fishes. From 1711, Lady Tunggiya and Consort He were tasked with raising Hongli, a son of Prince Yong of the First Rank, Yinzhen.

Yongzheng era 
After the coronation of the Yongzheng Emperor in 1722, lady Tong was promoted to "Imperial Noble Consort" (皇贵妃), but the promotion ceremony was delayed until July 1724 due to national mourning.

Qianlong era 
In 1736, she was given a title "Dowager Imperial Noble Consort Shouqi" (寿祺皇贵妃; "shouqi" meaning "long-living and auspicious"). Imperial Noble Consort Shouqi resided in Palace of Tranquil Longevity together with four grand dowager consorts. While choosing suitable titles to be given to dowager consorts, the emperor said:There are four dowager consorts: that is Dowager Consort Tong, another is Dowager Consort He.

Original version:

此四位内，那位系佟太妃，那位系和太妃.These words justified emperor's decision to distinguish her as a person who had taken care after him in his childhood, although the decree was inspired by minister's suggestion.

Imperial Noble Consort Shouqi died on 24 April 1743 in her residence. She was granted posthumous title "Imperial Noble Consort Quehui" (悫惠皇贵妃; "quehui" meaning "honest and kind").

Ancestry

Titles
 During the reign of the Kangxi Emperor (r. 1661–1722):
 Lady Tong (from September/October 1668)
 Noble Consort (from January/February 1701), third rank consort
 During the reign of the Yongzheng Emperor (r. 1722–1735):
 Imperial Noble Consort (from July/August 1724), second rank consort
 During the reign of the Qianlong Emperor (r. 1735–1796):
 Imperial Noble Consort Shouqi (from December 1736)
 Imperial Noble Consort Quehui (from June/July 1743)

See also
 Ranks of imperial consorts in China#Qing
 Royal and noble ranks of the Qing dynasty

Notes

References
 

1668 births
1743 deaths
17th-century Chinese women
17th-century Chinese people
18th-century Chinese women
18th-century Chinese people
Consorts of the Kangxi Emperor